Steak de Burgo is a steak dish and a regional specialty in the Midwest, specifically Des Moines, Iowa. This traditional dish was originally made famous by Johnny and Kay's Restaurant. The dish usually consists of a beef tenderloin either topped with butter, garlic, and Italian herbs, or served in a sauce consisting of those same ingredients.

See also

 List of regional dishes of the United States
 List of steak dishes

References 

Beef dishes
Cuisine of the Midwestern United States
Culture of Des Moines, Iowa